Thesiastes is a genus of ant-loving beetles in the family Staphylinidae. There are at least four described species in Thesiastes.

Species
These four species belong to the genus Thesiastes:
 Thesiastes atratus Casey, 1894
 Thesiastes debilis (LeConte, 1878)
 Thesiastes fossulatus (Brendel, 1891)
 Thesiastes pumilis (LeConte, 1849)

References

Further reading

 
 

Pselaphinae
Articles created by Qbugbot